LGBT Humanists UK, founded in 1979, is a special interest section of Humanists UK which campaigns for lesbian, gay, bisexual and transgender (LGBT) equality and human rights in the United Kingdom. It also organises social events for LGBT humanists and public awareness initiatives around Humanism.

It was founded as a separate humanist organisation, the Gay Humanist Group, later the Gay and Lesbian Humanist Association (GALHA). It became a part of the British Humanist Association in 2012, and took on the name Galha LGBT Humanists before becoming LGBT Humanists UK in 2015. The British Humanist Association (BHA) became Humanists UK in 2017.

For many years, its President was the poet Maureen Duffy, who became a Patron of the BHA when the organisations merged. As GALHA, the group was independently affiliated with the International Humanist and Ethical Union (IHEU) and the NGO Amnesty International. The group is led by volunteers. Past chairs include Andrew Copson, the chief executive of the BHA, who is also President of IHEU.

History and Current Work

The Gay Humanist Group was originally founded in response to the Gay News 'blasphemy' trial by members of the Campaign for Homosexual Equality at their Brighton conference in August 1979. The group had been responded in response to unfounded accusations by Mary Whitehouse that a "gay humanist lobby" was influencing public opinion and public policy. The founding members of the Gay Humanist Group thought that, while Whitehouse's claims were unfounded and untrue, that a gay humanist lobby group was a good idea and indeed one urgently needed.

From its inception, the Gay Humanist Group worked to combat widespread prejudice and religious bigotry towards LGBT people in the UK, at a time when attitudes to homosexuality were still fairly negative on the whole. Since that time the organisation has played key roles in UK-wide campaigns for LGBT equality, particularly marriage rights for LGBT couples. The group had provided non-recognised humanist marriage ceremonies for same-sex couples since the 1980s, and coordinated a number of such ceremonies outside Parliament to inspire legislative action, which it credits with inspiring Mayor of London Ken Livingstone's London Partnership Register in 2001. This was in turn an inspiration for the 2005 Civil Partnership Act which preceded the Marriage (Same Sex Couples) Act in 2013.

LGBT Humanists UK remains the only organisation representing LGBT+ non-religious people and humanists in the UK. Boasting a long and proud history of campaigning, visibility and activism, LGBT Humanists UK provides fellowship for LGBT+ non-religious people and continues to lead the fight to ban conversion therapy in the UK. LGBT Humanists works closely with organisations including Stonewall and Faith to Faithless to campaign against so-called 'conversion' therapy and to support and empower survivors of this discredited and harmful practice.

The Gay Humanist Group became GALHA (Gay and Lesbian Humanist Association) in 1987. It later became Galha LGBT Humanists in 2012, and then LGBT Humanists in 2015. LGBT Humanists is led by the Coordinator Chris Lynch, and the committee also includes a permanent Secretary, Volunteer Manager, Events Coordinator, Newsletter Lead and Outreach Lead.

In recent years, LGBT Humanists has also played a key role in proudly supporting and providing guidance and event co-ordination for the annual Transgender Day of Remembrance.

See also
 Pink Triangle Trust

References

Sources
Gay and Lesbian Humanist Association (GALHA) by Bishopsgate Institute
Gay refugees need asylum by Peter Tatchell, writing for The Guardian newspaper
Consortium
International Humanist and Ethical Union
National Secular Society
GALHA LGBT Humanists on the UK LGBT Archive wiki
LGBT Humanists UK Homepage

External links

Humanist associations
LGBT organisations in the United Kingdom
1979 establishments in the United Kingdom
Organizations established in 1979